John Brown House, or John Brown Farmhouse or variations, may refer to:

in the United States
(by state)
John Stanford Brown House, Walnut Grove, California, listed on the NRHP in Sacramento County, California
John Brown Stone Warehouse, Fort Wayne, Indiana
John Brown Cabin, Osawatomie, Kansas
John C. Brown House, Mulberry, Kentucky, listed on the NRHP
The Gothic House, Portland, Maine, also known as the John J. Brown House
John Brown IV House, Swansea, Massachusetts
John Brown Farm and Gravesite, Lake Placid, New York
John Brown House, a historic house property owned by the Summit County Historical Society of Akron, Ohio
John Hartness Brown House, Cleveland Heights, Ohio, listed on the NRHP
John Brown Farmhouse (Hudson, Ohio), listed on the NRHP
John and Amelia Brown Farmhouse, Brownsville, Oregon, listed on the NRHP
John Brown House (Chambersburg, Pennsylvania)
John Brown Tannery Site, New Richmond, Pennsylvania
John Brown House (Providence, Rhode Island)
John R. Brown House, McKinney, Texas, listed on the NRHP
John M. Brown House, Washington, Texas, listed on the NRHP

See also
Brown House (disambiguation)